Daryan or Darian or Dareyan or Dariyan may also refer to:

Daryan, East Azerbaijan, a little city in East Azerbaijan Province
Darian, Iran, a city in Fars Province
Darian, Kermanshah, a village in Kermanshah Province
Darian Rural District, in Fars Province